In number theory, a cyclotomic field is a number field obtained by adjoining a complex root of unity to , the field of rational numbers.

Cyclotomic fields played a crucial role in the development of modern algebra and number theory because of their relation with Fermat's Last Theorem. It was in the process of his deep investigations of the arithmetic of these fields (for prime ) – and more precisely, because of the failure of unique factorization in their rings of integers – that Ernst Kummer first introduced the concept of an ideal number and proved his celebrated congruences.

Definition

For , let ; this is a primitive th root of unity.

Properties
 The th cyclotomic polynomial 

 For , the discriminant of the extension  is
 
 In particular,  is unramified above every prime not dividing .
 If  is a power of a prime , then  is totally ramified above .
 The unit group  is a finitely generated abelian group of rank , for any , by the Dirichlet unit theorem. In particular,  is finite only for }.

Relation with regular polygons 

Gauss made early inroads in the theory of cyclotomic fields, in connection with the problem of constructing a regular -gon with a compass and straightedge. His surprising result that had escaped his predecessors was that a regular 17-gon could be so constructed.  More generally, for any integer , the following are equivalent:
 a regular -gon is constructible;
  is a power of 2;
  for some integers  and Fermat primes .  (A Fermat prime is an odd prime  such that  is a power of 2.  The known Fermat primes are 3, 5, 17, 257, 65537, and it is likely that there are no others.)

Small examples
Correspondingly, a regular 3-gon and a regular 6-gon are constructible.
 : Similarly, so , and a regular 4-gon is constructible.

Relation with Fermat's Last Theorem 

A natural approach to proving Fermat's Last Theorem is to factor the binomial ,
where  is an odd prime, appearing in one side of Fermat's equation

 

as follows:

 

If unique factorization holds in the cyclotomic integers  , then it can be used to rule out the existence of nontrivial solutions to Fermat's equation.

 1 through 22, 24, 25, 26, 27, 28, 30, 32, 33, 34, 35, 36, 38, 40, 42, 44, 45, 48, 50, 54, 60, 66, 70, 84, 90.

Kummer found a way to deal with the failure of unique factorization. He introduced a replacement for the prime numbers in the cyclotomic integers , measured the failure of unique factorization via the class number  and proved that if  is not divisible by a prime  (such  are called regular primes) then Fermat's theorem is true for the exponent . Furthermore, he gave a criterion to determine which primes are regular, and established Fermat's theorem for all prime exponents  less than 100, except for the irregular primes 37, 59, and 67. Kummer's work on the congruences for the class numbers of cyclotomic fields was generalized in the twentieth century by Iwasawa in Iwasawa theory and by Kubota and Leopoldt in their theory of p-adic zeta functions.

List of class numbers of cyclotomic fields 

See also
Kronecker–Weber theorem
Cyclotomic polynomial

References

Sources
 Bryan Birch, "Cyclotomic fields and Kummer extensions", in J.W.S. Cassels and A. Frohlich (edd), Algebraic number theory, Academic Press, 1973.  Chap.III, pp. 45–93.
 Daniel A. Marcus, Number Fields, first edition, Springer-Verlag, 1977
 
 Serge Lang, Cyclotomic Fields I and II, Combined second edition. With an appendix by Karl Rubin. Graduate Texts in Mathematics, 121. Springer-Verlag, New York, 1990.

Further reading
 
 
 
 On the Ring of Integers of Real Cyclotomic Fields. Koji Yamagata and Masakazu Yamagishi: Proc,Japan Academy, 92. Ser a (2016)
Algebraic number theory